Eymur is a village and municipality in the Agdash Rayon of Azerbaijan. It has a population of 953. The municipality consists of the villages of Eymur and Ağcaqovaq.

References 

Populated places in Agdash District